Chintaman may refer to:

Suryakant Chintaman Chafekar AVSM, Air Vice Marshal, Senior Air and Administration Staff Officer in the Indian Air Force
Chintaman D. Deshmukh, CIE, ICS (1896–1982), Indian civil servant, Governor of the Reserve Bank of India
Ramchandra Chintaman Dhere (1930–2016), Marathi writer from Maharashtra, India
Chintaman Rao Gautam (born 1899), member of parliament from Balaghat constituency of Madhya Pradesh, India
Chintaman Vinayak Joshi (1892–1963), Marathi humorist and a researcher in Pali literature
Narasimha Chintaman Kelkar (1872–1947), lawyer from Miraj as well as a writer
Keshavkumar Chintaman Ketkar, Indian writer, politician and former journalist
Chintaman Ganesh Kolhatkar (1891–1959),  Marathi stage actor, director, producer, and playwright
Chintaman Govind Pandit, OBE (1895–1991), Indian virologist,  founder director of the Indian Council of Medical Research
Chintaman Vinayak Vaidya (1861–1938), Marathi-language historian and writer from Maharashtra, India
Chintaman Vanaga (1950–2018), Indian politician and Adivasi leader from Maharashtra

See also
Chintaman Ganesh railway station, small railway station in Ujjain, Madhya Pradesh, near the Chintaman Ganesh Temple
Chintaman Ganesh Temple, Ujjain, the biggest temple of Lord Ganesha in Ujjain of Madhya Pradesh, India
Chintamani (disambiguation)